Progonos Sgouros was a late 13th-century Byzantine senior military commander from Principality of Arbanon (Medieval Albania) with the rank of megas hetaireiarches. He was lord of Ohrid during the Byzantine Empire's territorial control over the city.

Biography 
Progonos Sgouros was an Albanian from Durrës (Byzantine Dyrrhachion) and belonged to the prominent Skuraj family. He was married to Eudokia, a female relative of Andronikos II Palaiologos (r. 1282–1328), becoming a gambros of the Byzantine emperor.

Around 1294–1295, he restored the Church of the Virgin Peribleptos in Ohrid, at the time under Byzantine rule, which later came to be known as St. Clement after Saint Clement of Ohrid. Progonos gifted an Iconostasis of 8 panels, together with an icon of the Virgin Peribleptos of which only a fragment survived, with the iconostasis depicting the main feasts of the Church. The works were painted by Eutychios and Michael Astrapas, from Thessaloniki. A portrait of Saint Astius in the church was likely donated by him as a symbol of the close ties between Durrës and Ohrid.

References 

13th-century Byzantine people
Byzantine generals
Year of death unknown
Year of birth unknown
13th-century Albanian people
Megaloi hetaireiarchai